Catherine, Princess of Wales, has received several titles, decorations and honorary appointments both during her time as Duchess of Cambridge and Princess of Wales. Each is listed below; where two dates are shown, the first indicates the date of receiving the title or award and the second indicates the date of its loss or renunciation.

Royal and noble titles and style

Upon her marriage in 2011, Catherine gained the style Royal Highness and the titles Duchess of Cambridge, Countess of Strathearn, and Baroness Carrickfergus. She was normally known as "Her Royal Highness The Duchess of Cambridge" except in Scotland, where she was instead called "Her Royal Highness The Countess of Strathearn".

On her father-in-law's accession to the throne on 8 September 2022, Catherine also became Duchess of Cornwall and Duchess of Rothesay. She was thus briefly called "Her Royal Highness The Duchess of Cornwall and Cambridge". She additionally assumed the titles Countess of Carrick, Baroness of Renfrew, Lady of the Isles and Princess of Scotland upon her husband's becoming heir apparent. On 9 September 2022, the King announced the appointment of William as Prince of Wales and Earl of Chester, with Catherine becoming Princess of Wales and Countess of Chester.

Commonwealth realms

Appointments (Shown in order in which appointments were made, not order of precedence)
 

Decorations and medals (Shown in order in which appointments were made, not order of precedence)

Honorary military appointments
 Canada
  5 July 2011present: Honorary Canadian Ranger
 United Kingdom
  16 December 2015present: Honorary Air Commandant of the Royal Air Force Air Cadets
  29 June 2021present: Lady Sponsor of HMS Glasgow
  21 December 2022present: Colonel of the Irish Guards

Other appointments 
 9 April 2013present: Lady Sponsor of Royal Princess
 26 September 2019present: Lady Sponsor of RRS Sir David Attenborough

Honorific eponym 
Awards
 Their Royal Highnesses The Duke and Duchess of Cambridge Award, University of Waterloo in Waterloo, Ontario, Canada
 Duke and Duchess of Cambridge's Parks Canada Youth Ambassadors Program

See also
 List of titles and honours of George VI
 List of titles and honours of Queen Elizabeth The Queen Mother
 List of titles and honours of Elizabeth II
 List of titles and honours of Prince Philip, Duke of Edinburgh
 List of titles and honours of Charles III
 List of titles and honours of Queen Camilla
 List of titles and honours of William, Prince of Wales
 List of titles and honours of Anne, Princess Royal
 List of honours of the British royal family by country

References

Catherine, Princess of Wales
Lists of titles by person of the United Kingdom
British monarchy-related lists
Commonwealth royal styles

Dames Grand Cross of the Royal Victorian Order